Barry Moreland is an Australian dancer and choreographer. He was born in Melbourne in 1943. He trained at the Australian Ballet School and in 1962 joined The Australian Ballet.

References

Living people
1943 births
People from Melbourne
Australian Ballet School alumni
Date of birth missing (living people)
Australian choreographers
20th-century Australian dancers